Fyffe is a town in DeKalb County, Alabama, United States. It was incorporated in 1956. At the 2020 census, the population was 967. Fyffe is located atop Sand Mountain.

History
Fyffe was founded in the 1880s. The origin of the name "Fyffe" is obscure, though it was apparently suggested by the Postal Service when the post office was established.  A high school was established shortly afterward in 1917.

In 1959, Fyffe hosted the National Sacred Harp Singing Convention, a gathering of Sacred Harp musicians from around the region.  Noted musicologist Alan Lomax recorded many of the performances at the convention.

An EF4 tornado struck this city on April 27, 2011, touching down in Lakeview, initially causing structural damage to small buildings and snapping trees. It grew in intensity, causing major structural damage to several homes and buildings before moving on to Rainsville, where damage was even more extensive.

Geography
The town is situated along State Route 75, southwest of Rainsville and Shiloh, near the eastern edge of Sand Mountain.

Demographics

As of the 2010 census Fyffe had a population of 1,018.  There were 418 households.  The racial and ethnic composition of the population was 93.7% non-Hispanic white, 0.3% African American, 1.5% Native American, 0.7% Asian, 1.1% from some other race, 2.5% from two or more races and 1.3% Hispanic or Latino or any race.

As of 2000, there were 971 people, 411 households, and 286 families residing in the town.  The population density was 220.5 inhabitants per square mile (85.2/km2).  There were 458 housing units at an average density of 40.2 inhabitants/km2 (104.0 inhabitants/mi2).  The racial make-up of the town was 94.03% White, 0.93% African American, 1.24% Native American, 0.31% Asian, 0.00% Pacific Islander, 1.13% from other races, and 2.37% from two or more races.  1.85% of the population were Hispanic or Latino of any race.

There were 411 households, out of which 30.2% had children under the age of 18 living with them, 54.5% were married couples living together, 11.4% had a woman whose husband does not live with her, and 30.2% were non-families. 28.7% of all households were made up of individuals, and 14.4% had someone living alone who was 65 years of age or older.  The average household size was 2.36 and the average family size was 2.84.

In the town, the population was spread out, with 23.9% under the age of 18, 8.3% from 18 to 24, 28.4% from 25 to 44, 22.1% from 45 to 64, and 17.2% who were 65 years of age or older.  The median age was 37 years.  For every 100 females, there were 85.0 males.  For every 100 females age 18 and over, there were 85.7 males.

The median income for a household in the town was $30,298, and the median income for a family was $31,908. Males had a median income of $30,385 versus $18,636 for females. The per capita income for the town was $13,713.  21.6% of the population and 13.7% of families were below the poverty line.  Out of the total people living in poverty, 33.6% were under the age of 18 and 19.9% were 65 or older.

Government
Fyffe has a Mayor/Council form of government.

Education
Fyffe High School, home of the "Red Devils," is a  member of the DeKalb County School System.

The Fyffe High School football team that has been known as a football powerhouse has led by legendary Coach Paul Benefield and has won multiple state championships in 2014, 2016, 2018, 2019 and 2020. Viewed by most as one of the most dominant teams in Alabama class 2A history. This years team backed up those claims by outscoring their opponents 639–43. Their starters on defense gave up only 3pts all year. The Fyffe Red Devils currently have a 45–0 game win streak. The Fyffe High School basketball team won the state championship in 2021, led by Now-Retired Coach Neil Thrash. Fyffe High School’s cheerleaders have also been a dominant team, winning 9 consecutive state championships in both 2A and 3A from 2012-2021.

Arts and culture
The town of Fyffe was the location of UFO sightings on Friday and Saturday, February 11–12, 1989. More than fifty people (at a time when the town of less than two thousand residents) called the Fyffe Police Department to report sightings on two separate occasions. This was later mentioned by late comedian Bill Hicks on his album (and video) "Relentless".

As a way of remembering the UFO sightings, Fyffe is home to an annual UFO (Unforgettable Family Outing) Festival every August and features hot air balloon rides available to the public as well as musical entertainment and outdoor games.

Notable people
Lowell Barron, Alabama state senator
Vestal Goodman, Southern Gospel artist, founding member of the Happy Goodman Family
Charlie Long, former professional football player
Frank O. Slater, Navy sailor killed in World War 2. USS Slater named in his honor
Bobby Wood, Tennessee state representative

References

External links

Official site

Towns in DeKalb County, Alabama
Towns in Alabama
1880s establishments in Alabama